Zhang Lei (born 1 April 1979) is a Chinese television presenter, best known for her work on China Central Television (CCTV) programmes such as Zongyi Shengdian and Happy China Trip.

Biography
Zhang was born in Yangquan, Shanxi on April 1, 1979. She graduated from the Communication University of China. On January 1, 2017, she won the first prize among over 11000 contestants in CCTV's TV program called Challenge Anchor. Since then, she joined the China Central Television (CCTV) as a host of Happy China Trip. She is now the host of Zongyi Shengdian. On January 27, 2017, she co-presented the CCTV New Year's Gala with Zhu Jun in Guilin branch venue.

Personal life
Rumor has it that Zhang Lei was married to Wang Jicai, chairman of the board of Woyuan Group, on June 1, 2013.

References

External links
 

1979 births
People from Yangquan
Living people
CCTV television presenters
Communication University of China alumni